Hajj Hasan may refer to:
 Hajj Hasan Kandi
 Hajj Hasan-e Khaleseh
 Hajj Hasan-e Olya

See also
 Hajji Hasan (disambiguation)